Joseph Raymond Maross (February 7, 1923 – November 7, 2009) was an American stage, film, and television actor whose career spanned over four decades. Working predominantly on television in supporting roles or as a guest star, Maross performed in a wide variety of series and made-for-television movies between the early 1950s and mid-1980s.

Early life
Born in Barnesboro, Pennsylvania, Maross served in the Marine Corps during World War II and was stationed in Hawaii. He attended Yale University after the war and received his theater arts degree there in 1947.

Career
Maross's Broadway credits include Ladies Night in a Turkish Bath (1949) and The Innkeepers (1955).

The first feature film in which Maross was cast is the 1958 World War II drama Run Silent, Run Deep. He can also be seen in subsequent productions such as Elmer Gantry, Zig Zag, Sometimes a Great Notion, The Salzburg Connection, and Rich and Famous.

Although Maross worked periodically in films, he achieved greater acting success on television, where he became a familiar face to American audiences, especially during the 1950s and 1960s. He can be seen in episodes of assorted series originally broadcast during that period. He has roles in the 1959 episode "A Personal Matter" on Alfred Hitchcock Presents and in three episodes of Perry Mason: "The Case of the Crying Cherub" (1960), "The Case of the Lavender Lipstick", and "The Case of the Potted Planter" (1963).  He also appears in supporting roles or as a guest star in Behind Closed Doors, Mission: Impossible, The Fugitive, The Outer Limits, Wanted: Dead or Alive, The Invaders, Gunsmoke, The Virginian, Twelve O'Clock High, Kentucky Jones, The Time Tunnel (in an episode in which he portrays George Armstrong Custer), Hawaii Five-O, the Mannix episode "Cry Silence," Hawkins, The Rockford Files, the Cannon episodes "Call Unicorn" and "Blood Lines," the Combat! episode "A Little Jazz", and the Bonanza episode "Escape to Ponderosa". Maross is a central character as well in two episodes of The Twilight Zone: "Third from the Sun" and "The Little People". While the frequency of his work on television began to decline by the late 1970s, Maross continued to perform into the 1980s. An example of this is his portrayal of Captain Mike Benton in the series Code Red, which aired for one season on ABC from 1981 to 1982.

Support for film organizations
Maross was a founding member of "Projects 58", an acting, writing and directing group based in Los Angeles. He was also a voting member of the Academy of Motion Picture Arts and Sciences.

Death
In November 2009, at age 86, Maross died of cardiac arrest at a convalescent hospital in Glendale, California.

Filmography

References

External links

1923 births
People from Cambria County, Pennsylvania
American male film actors
American male television actors
2009 deaths
Male actors from Pennsylvania
20th-century American male actors
United States Marine Corps personnel of World War II